The men's foil was one of ten fencing events on the fencing at the 2000 Summer Olympics programme. It was the twenty-third appearance of the event. The competition was held on 20 September 2000. 40 fencers from 22 nations competed. Nations had been limited to three fencers each since 1928. The event was won by Kim Yeong-Ho of South Korea, the first Asian man to win an Olympic fencing title. Ralf Bißdorf of Germany took silver, the first medal for united Germany since 1928 (though East and West Germany had each won medals separately). Dmitry Shevchenko's bronze medal was Russia's first as an independent nation in the event.

Background

This was the 23rd appearance of the event, which has been held at every Summer Olympics except 1908 (when there was a foil display only rather than a medal event). Four of the eight quarterfinalists from 1996 returned: silver medalist Lionel Plumenail of France, fourth-place finisher Wolfgang Wienand of Germany, fifth-place finisher Rolando Tucker of Cuba, sixth-place finisher (and 1992 silver medalist) Sergei Golubitsky of Ukraine, and eighth-place finisher Kim Young-ho of South Korea. Golubitsky was the favorite, having won all three world championships between Atlanta 1996 and Sydney 2000. Kim was a serious contender as well, rising from an unknown giant-killer (knocking off then-reigning world champion Dmitriy Shevchenko of Russia in the 1996 Games) to a giant himself (taking second in the 1997 and third in the 1999 world championships). Shevchenko returned as well, hoping for a better result than his early exit in Atlanta.

For the first time in the event's history, no nations made their debut in the men's foil. France and the United States each made their 21st appearance, tied for most of any nation; France had missed only the 1904 (with fencers not traveling to St. Louis) and the 1912 (boycotted due to a dispute over rules) foil competitions, while the United States had missed the inaugural 1896 competition and boycotted the 1980 Games altogether.

Competition format

The 1996 tournament had vastly simplified the competition format into a single-elimination bracket, with a bronze medal match. The 2000 tournament continued to use that format. Bouts were to 15 touches. Standard foil rules regarding target area, striking, and priority were used.

Schedule

All times are Australian Eastern Standard Time (UTC+10)

Results

The field of 40 fencers competed in a single-elimination tournament to determine the medal winners. Semifinal losers proceeded to a bronze medal match.

Section 1

Section 2

Section 3

Section 4

Finals

Final classification

References

External links 
 Official Report of the 2000 Sydney Summer Olympics

Foil men
Men's events at the 2000 Summer Olympics